Álvaro Alberto the Brazil's first nuclear-powered attack submarine, is part of a strategic partnership signed between France and Brazil on 23 December 2008 by then-presidents Luiz Inácio Lula da Silva and Nicolas Sarkozy, that created the Submarine Development Program, a naval modernization plan of the Brazilian Armed Forces. The boat is the fifth unit of the Riachuelo-class, based on the French Scorpène-class. The submarine is being constructed by the Brazilian state-owned naval company ICN.

Once Álvaro Alberto is completed, Brazil will be the seventh country in the world to field nuclear submarines. Brazil might be the first new operator of the ship type since 1987, when India commissioned the former Soviet Navy Charlie-class submarine INS Chakra.

Álvaro Alberto was named after the former Brazilian Navy vice admiral and scientist Álvaro Alberto da Motta e Silva, who was the responsible for the implementation of the country's nuclear program. He also served as President of the United Nations Atomic Energy Commission between 1946–47, and as President of the Brazilian Academy of Sciences for two terms, from 1935–37 and 1949–51.

History
The Navy's nuclear submarine project dates back to the 1970s. It was decided by program officials at the time that Brazil should obtain the three vital processes before start the construction of a nuclear submarine. The nuclear fuel cycle domain, the development of a modern submarine hull, finally the development of a national nuclear reactor for naval purposes, called internally as Ciclone, Costado and Remo projects respectively.

Fuel cycle domain
The beginning of the project for the domain of the nuclear fuel cycle and nuclear reactors took place in 1979, in that year, under the military regime with leadership of the Army general Ernesto Geisel and later general João Figueiredo, two enthusiasts of the nuclear technology, the government secretly joined the Institute of Energy and Nuclear Research of Sao Paulo (IPEN) where it started to work in the most ambitious military program to date. In 1982, the scientists won its first major victory after adopting the ultracentrifugation technique for enrichment and learning about uranium hexafluoride technology in the city of Poços de Caldas, Minas Gerais. In the same year, the project researchers achieved isotopic uranium enrichment with centrifuges built entirely in Brazil. Over a period of approximately 20 years, the country acquired the full nuclear fuel cycle and was able to begin the construction of the naval nuclear reactor.

Submarine hull

On 23 December 2008, Brazil purchased four Scorpène-class conventionally-powered submarines from France in a deal of USD 10 billion, with a total technology transfer agreement, giving to the country the knowledge for the design and construction of modern submarine hulls. The first Brazilian Scorpène-class submarine, was launched on 14 December 2018. The project was initiated in 2010 through the Submarine Development Program (PROSUB), with the Madeira Island base in Rio de Janeiro as the submarine development and manufacturing point. Between 2010 and 2012, a group of 31 engineers, 25 officers and 6 civil employees, received theoretical training by the DCNS in Cherbourg. In 2018, more than 400 Brazilian engineers worked on the nuclear submarine project staff, originally formed by the group that received training in France.

Nuclear fuel & reactor

In 2018, after many years and a series of problems, delays in federal funding and program freezes, the prototype of the naval nuclear reactor, known internally as the Brazilian Multipurpose Reactor or LABGENE was launched, by the state-owned nuclear company Nuclebrás. In 2020, the General Directorate of Nuclear and Technological Development of the Navy (DGDNTM), authorized the production and testing of uranium dioxide pellets for zircaloy rods, essential for pressurized water nuclear reactors. The production of nuclear fuel for the Álvaro Alberto started in December 2021. On 6 June 2022, the Director General of the International Atomic Energy Agency, Rafael Grossi, stated that Brazil has initiated formal discussions with IAEA about Alvaro Alberto's nuclear fuel inspections by the international agency.

Brazilian strategic rationale

The Brazilian Navy modernization program plans the development and construction of six nuclear submarines. In the Brazilian doctrine, the raison d'etre of the national defense strategy is to develop deterrence capability against a possible hostile force to the national territory. The country understands that with its future nuclear fleet, at least some of its weapons will be able to survive the first strike of an enemy and prevent further attempts at aggression. This area is the country's exclusive economic zone, home to a huge diversity of marine species, valuable metallic minerals and other mineral resources, petroleum, and the world's second largest rare-earth reserve.

National nuclear policy

The country has a policy of no nuclear weapons since the 1990s. Nonetheless, experts at the Los Alamos National Laboratory have concluded that Brazil developed the technological capability to produce first generation nuclear warheads. If the country's current policy on this type of armament change, Brazil would be able to produce highly enriched uranium using centrifuges like Resende for this type of armament. Instead, the country opted for working in the development of a nuclear submarine fleet. So far in the naval history, only the five permanent members of the U.N. Security Council: the US, Russia, China, France and the UK, plus India - all nuclear-weapon states - have operated nuclear submarines. The organization Bulletin of the Atomic Scientists described Brazil as "the only non-nuclear weapon state on the verge of launching a nuclear-powered submarine". Carlo Patti, author of Brazil in the Global Nuclear Order, told newspaper The Economist, that Brazil's nuclear pursuit placed the country "in the threshold between being a nuclear state and not being a nuclear state". That policy, say experts, turned Brazil independent in the nuclear technology's field and allowed to "keep its international reputation as a responsible power among institutions for nuclear nonproliferation".

Characteristics
Álvaro Alberto has many similarities to his conventional predecessor of the Scorpène class. Its  length and 6,000-ton displacement will be propelled by a  fully-electric propulsion system.

The advantages of an SSN over a conventionally powered SSK are much longer endurance (a nuclear submarine can stay submerged for months and does not need refueling), and higher speed. Unlike most SSKs, SSNs do not have to surface periodically for air, which would compromise their stealth. Their roles include intelligence gathering platforms, insertion and exfiltration of special forces teams in addition to traditional hunter-killer SSN roles. The most prominent roles of the SSNs, is the capability to launch cruise missiles, giving a significant overlap between cruise missile submarines (SSGN) and traditional attack submarines.

Espionage allegations
In March 2022, The New York Times newspaper reported that US Navy employee Jonathan Toebbe and his wife Diana had approached the Brazilian embassy in Washington D.C. with an offer to sell nuclear secrets about the Virginia-class submarine to Brazilian military to aid in the development of the country's nuclear submarine program. Brazilian authorities then informed the FBI, which conducted an investigation culminating in the Toebbe's arrest for espionage; they pleaded guilty. Neither the American nor the Brazilian government have confirmed or denied the report.

Notes

References

Proposed ships
Riachuelo-class submarine
Submarine classes
Ships built in Brazil
Submarines of the Brazilian Navy
Attack submarines